is a city located in Nagano Prefecture, Japan. , the city had an estimated population of 27,559 in 11861 households, and a population density of 49 persons per km2.

Geography
The 3000 meter Northern Japanese Alps (or Hida Mountains) are to the west ranges to the west of the city and mountains of around 1000 meters form the eastern border. The Takase River runs through the city, which is located in the northern Matsumoto basin.

The Itoigawa-Shizuoka Tectonic Line active fault system is also running through the city.

Mountains: Mount Yarigatake, 
Rivers: Takase River
Lakes and marshes: 

Surrounding municipalities
Nagano Prefecture
 Matsumoto
 Nagano
 Azumino
 Matsukawa
 Ikeda
 Hakuba
 Ikusaka
 Ogawa
Toyama Prefecture
 Toyama
 Tateyama
 Kurobe
 Gifu Prefecture
 Takayama

Climate 
Due to its elevation, the city has a Köppen climate classification Dfa climate. Winters are cold and very snowy, while summers are very warm and wet.

History
The area of present-day Ōmachi was part of ancient Shinano Province. The area was part of the holdings of Matsumoto Domain during the Edo period. The modern town of Ōmachi was established with the creation of the municipalities system on April 1, 1889. It merged with the neighboring villages of Taira, Tokiwa and Yashiro on July 1, 1954 to form the city of Ōmachi. On January 1, 2006, the villages of Miasa and Yasaka (both from Kitaazumi District) were merged into Ōmachi.

Demographics
Per Japanese census data, the population of Ōmachi has been declining over the past 40 years.

Government
Ōmachi has a mayor-council form of government with a directly elected mayor and a unicameral city legislature of 16 members. The city contributes one member to the Nagano Prefectural Assembly.  In terms of national politics, Ōmachi is grouped with Matsumoto, Azumino, Higashichikuma District, Nagano, Kitaazumi District, Nagano, Kamiminochi District, Nagano and part of the city of Nagano to form Nagano 2nd District  in the lower house of the National Diet.

Economy
Ōmachi is a regional commercial center and a producer of aluminum, cotton thread and rice. Seasonal tourism to the mountains is also an important source of local income.

Education
Ōmachi has five public elementary schools, three public middle schools and one combined elementary/middle school operated by the city government. There are two public high schools operated by the Nagano Prefectural Board of Education.

Transportation

Railway
 East Japan Railway Company - Ōito Line
  -  -  -  -  -  -  -  -  - 
Kansai Electric Power Company
Kanden Tunnel Trolleybus

Highway

International relations
 - Innsbruck, Austria, since November 20, 1972
 - Mendocino, California,  United States since May 1980

Local attractions
Nishina Shinmei Shrine, a National Treasure
 Ōmachi Aloine Museum
Ōmachi Dam
Shin-Takasegawa Pumped Storage Station

References

External links 

Official Website 
Ōmachi City Tourism Website 

 
Cities in Nagano Prefecture